Borówki may refer to the following places in Poland:
Borówki, Lower Silesian Voivodeship (south-west Poland)
Borówki, Kuyavian-Pomeranian Voivodeship (north-central Poland)
Borówki, Subcarpathian Voivodeship (south-east Poland)
Borówki, Greater Poland Voivodeship (west-central Poland)